Nouri Ouznadji (born December 30, 1984, in Algiers) is an Algerian football player who is currently playing as a forward for USM Blida in the Algerian Ligue Professionnelle 2.

International career
Ouznadji made his international debut on May 2, 2008, coming as a second-half substitute for the Algerian A' National Team in its African Championship of Nations qualifier against Morocco.

Honours
 Finalist of the 2005 World Military Cup

References

1984 births
Algerian footballers
Living people
Footballers from Algiers
JS Kabylie players
NA Hussein Dey players
USM Alger players
Algerian Ligue Professionnelle 1 players
Algerian Ligue 2 players
Algeria A' international footballers
USM Blida players
Association football forwards
21st-century Algerian people